Charles City is a census-designated place (CDP) in Charles City County, Virginia, United States. It is the county seat of Charles City County. The population as of the 2020 census was 104.
 
The community is centered on the Charles City County Court House, from which it takes its variant names Charles City Court House and Charles City Courthouse. Charles City lies at the intersection of State Routes 5 and 155.

Notable people 
Susan Wise Bauer, writer and historian
Lott Cary, first black missionary to Africa
Benjamin Harrison V, signer of the Declaration of Independence
Martha Jefferson, First Lady of Virginia and wife of Thomas Jefferson
John Tyler, US president
Freeman Walker, US senator for Georgia

Demographics

2020 census

Note: the US Census treats Hispanic/Latino as an ethnic category. This table excludes Latinos from the racial categories and assigns them to a separate category. Hispanics/Latinos can be of any race.

References

Census-designated places in Charles City County, Virginia
County seats in Virginia
Census-designated places in Virginia
Populated places on the James River (Virginia)